Hylton George Leslie "Heck" Davies (1915-1945) was an Australian AIF officer who fell in WWII during the Battle of Balikpapan. He had been a top-grade rugby league footballer who played for Newtown in the NSWRFL in the 1930s.

Rugby career
Davies played four seasons of first grade for Newtown between 1936-1939 before his war service.

Military service
Davies enlisted in the AIF in late 1939 and didn't play rugby league again. He attained the rank of captain in the Australian Army and he served in Great Britain, Syria, The Middle East, Kokoda Track, Lae and Borneo.

Hylton Davies was killed during the Battle of Balikpapan in 1945 when a Japanese mortar shell hit Davies' battalion's headquarters.

Personal 
Davies married Lurline Hook, diving gold medallist at the 1938 Empire Games. She and their son, Ian, survived him.

References

1915 births
1945 deaths
Newtown Jets players
Rugby league wingers
Rugby league players from Sydney
Australian military personnel killed in World War II
Australian rugby league players
Australian Army personnel of World War II
Australian Army officers